Raymond Hendler (1923-1998) was an American artist known for his action painting.

Biography
Hendler was born in 1923 in Philadelphia, Pennsylvania. He studied at the Philadelphia College of Art and went on to serve in the United States Army He also studied at the Pennsylvania Academy of the Fine Arts and the Tyler School of Art and Architecture. He traveled to Paris around in 1949 under the Servicemen's Readjustment Act of 1944 (the G.I. Bill). There he studied at the Academie de la Grand Chaumiere and was a founding member of the Galerie Huit

He located in New York City in the early 1950's where he was a member of the New York Artists' Club. In the late 1960's Hendler moved to Minneapolis where he taught at the Minneapolis School of Art. For a time he served as head of the painting department. He retired in 1984. In 1963, Hendler received the Longview Foundation Purchase Award, juried by Willem de Kooning, Thomas B. Hess, Philip Guston, Harold Rosenberg, and David Smith.

Hendler died in 1998 in East Hampton, New York.

His work is in the collection of the Walker Art Center, and the Minneapolis Institute of Art.

References

External links
images of Hendler's work on ArtNet
Hendler CV on Berry Campbell website

Further reading
Raymond Hendler paintings reveal a happier side of Abstract Expressionism review of 2018 retrospective exhibit

1923 births
1998 deaths
20th-century American painters
American male painters
Alumni of the Académie de la Grande Chaumière
American expatriates in France
20th-century American male artists